Chiangmaiana is a genus of the family Cossidae (carpenter or goat moths).

Genus
 Chiangmaiana Kemal & Koçak, 2005 objective replacement name [pro Nirvana Yakovlev, 2004 nom. invalid.(preoc.name)] Cesa, Miscellaneous papers, 91/92:  12. [misdating as: "Kemal & Koçak, 2007" (Yakovlev & Saldaitis, 2007: 12 ) Eversmannia, 11-12: 12 ; misdating as: "Kemal & Koçak, 2006" (Yakovlev, 2009: 1207, 1211.) Zoologicheskii Zhurnal, 88 (10): 1207, 1211.]  ( ≡ Nirvana Yakovlev, 2004 nom. invalid.(preoc.name) non Stål, 1859 nec Kirkaldy, 1900  nec Tsukuda & Nishiyama, 1979);( ≡ Nirrvanna Yakovlev, 2007 nom. invalid.( junior object. syn.), objective replacement name (mistaken repl.n.) ) is a genus of moths in the family Cossidae.

Species
 Chiangmaiana buddhi (Yakovlev, 2004)
 Chiangmaiana qinlingensis (Hua, Chou, Fang & Chen, 1990)

References

 , 2005. Nomenclatural notes on various taxa of the Moths (Lepidoptera). — Centre for Entomological Studies Ankara, Miscellaneous Papers, 91/92: 11-14. 
 , 2009. Catoptinae subfam. n., a new subfamily of carpenter-moths (Lepidoptera: Cossidae). Entomological Review 89 (8): 927-932.
 , 2007.  Little known species of Palaearctic and Oriental Cossidae (Lepidoptera). II. Chiangmaiana qinlingensis Hua, Chou, Fang & Chen, 1990. Eversmannia, 11-12: 12–13; Pl.[I]: map2, f.2

External links
Natural History Museum Lepidoptera generic names catalog

Catoptinae
Cossidae genera